KAIM-FM (95.5 MHz "95.5 The Fish") is a Contemporary Christian radio station based in Honolulu, Hawaii. The Salem Media Group outlet broadcasts with an ERP of 100 kW.  Its studios are in Honolulu's Kalihi district, and its transmitter is near Akupu, Hawaii.

History

KAIM was the first commercial FM radio station in Hawai'i. It went on the air November 1, 1953, having narrowly been beaten out by KVOK-FM for the distinction of being the first FM on the islands. The Christian Broadcasting Association, owned by the Reverend Billy Graham, owned KAIM and broadcast from studios and a transmitter on 12th Avenue in the Kaimuki neighborhood, which gave rise to its callsign. An FM suffix was added in 1956 to coincide with the launch of KAIM on 870 AM; that station is today KHCM 880.

Even though KAIM has been a Contemporary Christian outlet since 1992, it wasn't until after Salem bought the station in 2000 that it adopted "The Fish" moniker and slogan.

References

External links
 KAIM official website

Christianity in Honolulu
AIM-FM
AIM-FM
Radio stations established in 1978
1978 establishments in Hawaii
Salem Media Group properties
Contemporary Christian radio stations in the United States